André Göransson (born 30 April 1994) is a Swedish tennis player. He has a career-high ATP singles ranking of world No. 773, achieved on 25 September 2017, and in doubles a ranking of world No. 62, achieved on 17 January 2022. He is the current number one Swedish doubles player. Göransson has won seven ATP Challenger doubles titles and two Futures doubles titles.

College career
Göransson played college tennis at the University of California, Berkeley.

Professional career

2020-2021: First ATP title and top 100 debut; Grand Slam quarterfinal and second ATP Tour final

He won his first ATP doubles title at the 2020 Maharashtra Open partnering Christopher Rungkat. He reached the top 100, at world No. 81, on 10 February 2020.

At the 2021 Wimbledon Championships Göransson and his partner Casper Ruud made the quarterfinals of the men's doubles tournament.

At the ATP 250 tournament 2021 Stockholm Open, he reached the quarterfinals with Swedish compatriot Robert Lindstedt. He reached a career-high ranking of World No. 64 on 8 November 2021.

2022: Third and fourth ATP final
He reached his third ATP final at the Chile Open with American Nathaniel Lammons.

He reached the final at the Estoril Open with Argentine Máximo González after defeating fourth seeds Raven Klaasen/ Ben McLachlan.

ATP career finals

Doubles: 4 (1 title, 3 runner-ups)

Challenger and Futures finals

Singles: 1 (0–1)

Doubles: 28 (13 titles, 15 runners-up)

References

External links
 
 

1994 births
Living people
Swedish male tennis players
California Golden Bears men's tennis players
Sportspeople from Skåne County
21st-century Swedish people